Leptoclinides is a genus of tunicates belonging to the family Didemnidae. The genus has a cosmopolitan distribution.

Species
The following species are recognised in the genus Leptoclinides:
 
Leptoclinides aciculus 
Leptoclinides albamaculatus 
Leptoclinides apertus 
Leptoclinides aspiculatum 
Leptoclinides auranticus 
Leptoclinides brandi 
Leptoclinides brasiliensis 
Leptoclinides caelestis 
Leptoclinides capensis 
Leptoclinides carduus 
Leptoclinides cavernosus 
Leptoclinides coelenteratus 
Leptoclinides comitus 
Leptoclinides compactus 
Leptoclinides complexus 
Leptoclinides confirmatus 
Leptoclinides constellatus 
Leptoclinides coronatus 
Leptoclinides crocotulus 
Leptoclinides cucurbitus 
Leptoclinides cuspidatus 
Leptoclinides decoratus 
Leptoclinides diemenensis 
Leptoclinides doboensis 
Leptoclinides dubius 
Leptoclinides duminus 
Leptoclinides durus 
Leptoclinides echinatus 
Leptoclinides echinus 
Leptoclinides erinaceus 
Leptoclinides exiguus 
Leptoclinides faeroensis 
Leptoclinides fluxus 
Leptoclinides frustus 
Leptoclinides fungiformis 
Leptoclinides grandistellus 
Leptoclinides hawaiiensis 
Leptoclinides imperfectus 
Leptoclinides kerguelenensis 
Leptoclinides kingi 
Leptoclinides latus 
Leptoclinides levitatus 
Leptoclinides lissus 
Leptoclinides longicollis 
Leptoclinides lotufoi 
Leptoclinides macrotestis 
Leptoclinides maculatus 
Leptoclinides madara 
Leptoclinides magnistellus 
Leptoclinides marmoratus 
Leptoclinides marmoreus 
Leptoclinides minimus 
Leptoclinides multilobatus 
Leptoclinides multipapillatus 
Leptoclinides novaezelandiae 
Leptoclinides ocellatus 
Leptoclinides oscitans 
Leptoclinides placidus 
Leptoclinides planus 
Leptoclinides prunus 
Leptoclinides pulvinus 
Leptoclinides ramosum 
Leptoclinides reticulatus 
Leptoclinides rigidus 
Leptoclinides robiginis 
Leptoclinides rufus 
Leptoclinides rugosum 
Leptoclinides seminudus 
Leptoclinides sluiteri 
Leptoclinides sparsus 
Leptoclinides subviridis 
Leptoclinides sulawesii 
Leptoclinides torosus 
Leptoclinides tuberculatus 
Leptoclinides tulearensis 
Leptoclinides umbrosus 
Leptoclinides uniorbis 
Leptoclinides unitestis 
Leptoclinides vesica 
Leptoclinides volvus

References

Tunicates